The Road and Rail Traffic Appeal Tribunal was appointed under the Road and Rail Traffic Act of 1933. The Act came into effect on 1 January 1934. The function of the Tribunal was to examine road haulage and to establish a licensing procedure for goods vehicles.

The Tribunal ceased to exist in 1951. Its responsibilities were taken over by the Transport Tribunal.

Former courts and tribunals in the United Kingdom
1934 establishments in the United Kingdom
1951 disestablishments in the United Kingdom
Courts and tribunals established in 1934
Courts and tribunals disestablished in 1951